Alain Oulman (15 June 1928 – 29 March 1990 (aged 61)) was a Portuguese songwriter. He was responsible for some of the biggest hits of Amália Rodrigues.

References

1928 births
1990 deaths
People from Oeiras, Portugal
Portuguese songwriters
Male songwriters
20th-century Portuguese writers